The Aston Martin DP-100 is a Vision Gran Turismo car, designed by Aston Martin as a concept car for use in the game Gran Turismo 6.

References

DP-100
Gran Turismo (series)